Grizzly Creek Redwoods State Park is a state park of California, United States, harboring groves of coast redwoods in three separate units along the Van Duzen River. The small park was created by a donation from Owen R. Cheatham, founder of Georgia-Pacific Corporation, who wanted to preserve the stand of redwoods in perpetuity.

Use
The park is so secluded due to its location off the major regional artery, U.S. Route 101, that on a weekday a visitor can be the only person in any one of the several groves. Cheatham Grove has a small trail about a mile long and was one of the filming sites for Return of the Jedi as the Forest Moon of Endor. There is also 1 albino redwood along the trail and is the location of a Redwood Edventure Quest.

Climate

According to the Köppen Climate Classification system, Grizzly Creek Redwoods State Park has a warm-summer mediterranean climate, abbreviated "Csb" on climate maps.

Proposed for closure

Grizzly Creek Redwoods State Park was one of 70 California state parks proposed for closure by July 2012 as part of a deficit reduction program.  It was previously one of several state parks threatened with closure in 2008.  Those closures were ultimately avoided by cutting hours and maintenance system-wide.

See also
List of California state parks

References

External links 
Official Grizzly Creek Redwoods State Park website

State parks of California
Parks in Humboldt County, California
Coast redwood groves
Old-growth forests
Campgrounds in California
Protected areas established in 1943
1943 establishments in California